Sarah Maestas Barnes (born May 14, 1980) is an American lawyer and politician who served in the New Mexico House of Representatives from the 15th district from 2015 to 2019. She opted not to run for re-election in 2018, and was succeeded by Democrat Dayan Hochman-Vigil.

References

External links

Sarah Maestas Barnes at Ballotpedia

1980 births
Living people
Politicians from Albuquerque, New Mexico
University of New Mexico alumni
University of New Mexico School of Law alumni
Republican Party members of the New Mexico House of Representatives
Women state legislators in New Mexico
21st-century American politicians
21st-century American women politicians